Italiano, or the Italian language, is a Romance language of the Indo-European language family.

Italiano or Italiana may also refer to anything originating from or associated with Italy:
 L’Italiano,  weekly literary magazine between 1926 and 1942 in Italy
 L'Italiano (newspaper), a newspaper in Argentina
 Italiana (album), an album by the Italian singer Mina
 Sueca Italiana, a variant of the game briscola
 Vincenzo Italiano, an Italian football manager and former player

See also
 
 
 Italian (disambiguation)

Italian-language surnames